The Simpsons Meet the Bocellis in "Feliz Navidad" is an American animated short film based on the television series The Simpsons produced by Gracie Films and 20th Television Animation, debuting on the streaming service Disney+ on December 15, 2022. Like the previous shorts, it was directed by David Silverman.

Plot 
On Christmas, Bart, Lisa, and Maggie rush downstairs to open their presents. Homer stops them to let Marge goes first and reveals that Andrea Bocelli is hiding behind the tree. Marge and Lisa are excited to see him whilst Bart doesn't care and just wants to open his presents. As Bocelli starts to sing "Con te partirò", Bart gets into the music and sings along with Bocelli. After they stop, Homer asks Andrea for a Christmas song. Andrea turns to his children Matteo and Virginia for help. Virginia suggests that they sing "Feliz Navidad", and the three of them sing it to the Simpsons, with the Simpsons joining in.

Across town, Chief Wiggum uses the electric chair on a turkey, which Snake Jailbird carves. Ralph Wiggum is dressed as the Easter bunny and tries to put an egg in his basket, which has a hole in. Itchy in "Steamboat Itchy" is seen in a Santa hat, Cletus Spuckler and Brandine Spuckler put up Christmas stockings for their children, and Groundskeeper Willie gives Sideshow Bob a rake, which he then steps on. During the song, Bart unwraps his bike and cycles off across the Mickey Mouse icon, much to his annoyance.

Release 
The Simpsons Meet the Bocellis in "Feliz Navidad" was released on December 15, 2022. On December 7, this short was announced alongside the promotional poster.

Cast 
 Dan Castellaneta as Homer Simpson, Santa's Little Helper
 Julie Kavner as Marge Simpson
 Nancy Cartwright as Bart Simpson, Maggie Simpson, Mickey Mouse
 Yeardley Smith as Lisa Simpson
 Andrea Bocelli as himself
 Matteo Bocelli as himself
 Virginia Bocelli as herself

References

External links 
 

2022 animated films
2022 short films
2020s American films
2020s animated short films
20th Century Studios short films
American animated short films
American Christmas films
American multilingual films
Disney+ original films
Films directed by David Silverman
Gracie Films films
The Simpsons short films